The Wellfleet Drive-In Theater, the only drive-in theater on Cape Cod, located in Wellfleet, Massachusetts along U.S. Route 6, near the Massachusetts Audubon Society's Wellfleet Bay Wildlife Sanctuary.  The complex offers first-run double features in season, with other attractions such as indoor cinemas, a flea market, a miniature golf course, and restaurants.

The Drive-In is one of the venues for the annual Provincetown International Film Festival in Provincetown, Massachusetts . Frommer's lists the Drive-In as one of the "500 Places to See Before They Disappear" and Travel and Leisure selected it as a Top Ten Retro Escape.

History
Its original owners, John Jentz and Charlie Zehnder, opened the drive-in on July 3, 1957. It has a  screen, with sound provided by both an FM stereo signal and the original individual monaural speakers that can be attached to a car's window.  The mini-golf features obstacles that date back to 1961.  The cinema was built in the 1980s; according to Eleanor Hazen, its owner at the time, one of the reasons the cinema was built is that film distributors started refusing to allow drive-ins to show first-run feature films.

See also
 List of drive-in theaters

References

External links
Wellfleet Cinemas

Drive-in theaters in the United States
Cinemas and movie theaters in Massachusetts
Wellfleet, Massachusetts
1957 establishments in Massachusetts
Entertainment companies established in 1957